Tu gali šokti ("You Can Dance") was a Lithuanian television dance competition based on the format of the international So You Think You Can Dance franchise of television shows. Broadcast on Lithuania's TV3 and hosted by Mindaugas Meskauskas, the series premiered in spring of 2010 and aired two seasons.  The show was produced by Saulius Urbonavičius.

Season 1Top Seven Girls: Modesta Butautytė, Rima Kundrotienė, Alina Galičnaitė, Inga Plataunaitė, Gintare Kirklytė, Gaudre Kazlauskaite, Irina NazarenkoTop Seven Boys: Danas Jakševičius, Tomas Uroška, Tomas Legenzova, Naglis Bierancas, Viktoras Zujevas, Laurynas Žakevičius, Karolis ParadnikasWinner: Tomas Uroška 
Runner-Up: Gaudre Kazlauskaite

See also
Dance on television

Similar shows
 The Ultimate Dance Battle
 Live to Dance/Got to Dance
 America's Best Dance Crew
 Superstars of Dance
 Dance India Dance
 Se Ela Dança, Eu Danço

References

So You Think You Can Dance
Dance competition television shows
2010 Lithuanian television series debuts
2012 Lithuanian television series endings
Lithuanian television series
2010s Lithuanian television series
Non-American television series based on American television series
TV3 (Lithuania) original programming